Ricky Darryl Schroeder (born 5 January 1991, in Worcester) is a former South African rugby union player, who most recently played with the  in Super Rugby. His regular position is scrum-half.

He retired from rugby in 2017 and pursued a career in the media, joining the Cape Town-based Kfm 94.5 radio station.

Career

Youth and Varsity Rugby
He came up through the  youth ranks, representing them at the Under-16 Grant Khomo Week in 2007 and the Under-18 Craven Week tournaments in 2008 and 2009.

In 2010, he was included in the  team for the Under-19 Provincial Championship competition, where he made thirteen appearances.

He almost repeated the feat in 2012 with the  side, starting thirteen of their fourteen games during the 2012 Under-21 Provincial Championship season, but this time ending on the losing side against the  team.

Western Province
His first class debut came during the 2012 Vodacom Cup season, coming on as a late substitute for Nic Groom in their first match of the season against near neighbours . He appeared an additional four times in that competition, as well as being an unused substitute on five occasions. He made one further appearances for them during the 2013 Vodacom Cup competition.

Boland Cavaliers
After failing to break into Western Province's Currie Cup team, he then joined Wellington-based side  on loan during the 2013 Currie Cup First Division season.

Golden Lions

References

1991 births
South African rugby union players
Living people
Rugby union players from Worcester, South Africa
Boland Cavaliers players
Golden Lions players
Western Province (rugby union) players
Southern Kings players
Rugby union scrum-halves